Misery Peak is a peak,  high, at the extreme west side of Roberts Massif, Antarctica, occupied as a survey station. It was so named by the Southern Party of the New Zealand Geological Survey Antarctic Expedition of 1961–62 to describe the many miserable hours spent here while waiting for clouds to disperse.

References

Mountains of the Ross Dependency
Dufek Coast